Zam Zam Isfahan Futsal Club is an Iranian futsal club based in Isfahan.

History

Establishment 
The club was originally known as Sanaye Giti Pasand Novin Isfahan, In the August 27, 2013, it was renamed Zam Zam Isfahan due to change of sponsorship.

Dissolution of Zam Zam 
In July 2014 Zam Zam terminated their sports activities due to financial problems. Rah Sari futsal club owned by Saeed Najarian took over their license. The new club was named Shahrvand Sari.

Season-by-season 
The table below chronicles the achievements of the Club in various competitions.

Honors 
National:
 Iran Futsal's 1st Division
 Champions (1): 2012-13
 Iran Futsal's 2nd Division
 Runners-up (1): 2012

References 

Futsal clubs established in 2010
Futsal clubs in Iran
Sport in Isfahan
2010 establishments in Iran
Defunct futsal clubs in Iran
Sports clubs disestablished in 2014
2014 disestablishments in Iran